The 2004 OFC Futsal Championship was the fourth edition of the main international futsal tournament of the Oceanian region. It took place in Canberra, Australia from July 25 to 29, 2004.

The tournament also acted as a qualifying tournament for the 2004 FIFA Futsal World Cup in Chinese Taipei. Australia won the tournament and qualified for the World Cup.

Championship 
The six participating teams played each on a single round-robin format. The top team of the group, Australia, won the championship and got a ticket to 2004 Futsal World Cup.

References
Oceanian Futsal Championship Overview 2004

OFC Futsal Championship
Oceanian Futsal Championship, 2004
Futsal
2004
2000s in Canberra
Sports competitions in Canberra
July 2004 sports events in Australia